Maniototo Area School is an area school in Ranfurly, Central Otago, New Zealand, serving students aged 5–18. Founded in 1879, it has  students as of  The school has a strong sporting tradition and an academic programme bolstered by video conferencing lessons and the OtagoNet project.

Maniototo Area School hosts international students aged 11–18. It is located near a winter sports centre and the Otago Rail Trail.

One area of special interest at the school is 'Bute Beds'. These are two fully furnished houses rented out as 'Bed and Breakfast' units  by the school. These are used to support social studies projects and to provide extra resources.

Notable alumni

 Sean Becker – curler 
 Tania Murray – high jumper and triple jumper
 Warren Dobson – curler
 Andrew Hore – rugby union player
 Tony Kreft – rugby union player
 Peter Petherick – cricketer

References

External links
 Official site

Educational institutions established in 1879
Schools in Otago
1879 establishments in New Zealand
Central Otago District